Hindaun City railway station (station code:- HAN) is a railway station serving Hindaun City in the state of Rajasthan, India. It comes under the Kota railway division of West Central Railway zone. Hindaun City is a B-Grade station on the Delhi–Mumbai route.

It is located in the Karauli district of Rajasthan State. The station code is HAN and it belongs to Kota Division. Railway stations near Hindaun railway station are Shri Mahabirji and Bayana Jn. Sawai Madhopur is the other railway station near Hindaun.

Trains
From Hindaun City there are trains to New Delhi, Mumbai, Lucknow, Kanpur, Jammutawi, Amritsar, Ludhiana, Jalandhar, Haridwar, Dehradun, Jaipur, Chandigarh, Kalka and Shri Mata Vaishno Devi Katra.

Superfast trains
 22917/22918 Bandra Terminus–Haridwar Express – weekly
 12926/12925 Amritsar–Mumbai Paschim Express – daily
 12059/60 Kota Jan Shatabdi Express
 12903/04 Golden Temple Mail
 12963/64 Mewar Express

Mail Express
 19024/19023 Firozpur Janata Express – daily
 19037/19038 Bandra Terminus–Gorakhpur Avadh Express
 19039/19040 Bandra Terminus–Muzaffarpur Avadh Express
 19019/19020 Bandra Terminus–Dehradun Express – daily
 13237/38/39/40 Patna–Kota Express
 19805/06 Kota–Udhampur Express
 19803/04 Kota–Vaishno Devi Katra Express

Passenger
 59355/56 Ratlam—Mathura passenger – daily
 59812/11 Ratlam–Agra Fort Haldighati – passenger
 59814/13 Kota–Agra Fort – passenger
 59806/05 Jaipur–Bayana – fast passenger
 54794/93 Sawai Madhopur–Mathura – passenger

Stations serving Hindaun Block Region

See also
Hindaun
Hindaun Block
Hindaun City bus depot
Karauli district

References

External links

Railway stations in Karauli district
Kota railway division